This is a list of the winners and nominations for the Primetime Emmy Award for Outstanding Casting for a Comedy Series.

Winners and nominations

2000s
{| class="wikitable" style="width:100%"
|- bgcolor="#bebebe"
! width="5%" | Year
! width="30%" | Program
! width="60%" | Casting
! width="5%" | Network
|-
| rowspan=6 style="text-align:center" | 2000(52nd)
|- style="background:#FAEB86"
| Freaks and Geeks: Season 1
| Allison Jones – casting executive; Coreen Mayrs and Jill Greenberg Sands – casting executives (location)
| NBC
|-
| Malcolm in the Middle: Season 1
| Mary V. Buck, Susan Edelman, Ken Miller, and Nikki Valko – casting executives
| Fox
|-
| Sex and the City: Season 2
| Kerry Barden, Billy Hopkins, Jennifer McNamara, and Suzanne Smith – casting executives
| HBO
|-
| Sports Night: Season 2'''
| Paula Rosenberg and Bonnie Zane – casting executives
| ABC
|-
| Will & Grace: Season 2| Tracy Lilienfield – casting executive
| NBC
|-
| rowspan=6 style="text-align:center" | 2001(53rd)
|- style="background:#FAEB86"
| Ally McBeal: Season 4| Ken Miller and Nikki Valko – casting executives
| Fox
|-
| Ed: Season 1| Brett Goldstein, Carol Kelsay, Jonathan Strauss, Todd Thaler, and Bonnie Zane – casting executives
| rowspan=2|NBC
|-
| Frasier: Season 7| Jeff Greenberg – casting executive
|-
| Sex and the City: Season 3| Jennifer McNamara – casting executive
| HBO
|-
| Will & Grace: Season 3| Tracy Lilienfield – casting executive
| NBC
|-
| rowspan=6 style="text-align:center" | 2002(54th)
|- style="background:#FAEB86"
| Sex and the City: Season 4| Jennifer McNamara – casting executive
| HBO
|-
| Frasier: Season 8| Jeff Greenberg – casting director
| rowspan=4|NBC
|-
| Friends: Season 8| Leslie Litt and Barbara Miller – casting directors
|-
| Scrubs: Season 1| Brett Benner and Debby Romano – casting directors
|-
| Will & Grace: Season 4| Tracy Lilienfield – casting director
|-
| rowspan=6 style="text-align:center" | 2003(55th)
|- style="background:#FAEB86"
| Sex and the City: Season 5| Jennifer McNamara – casting director
| HBO
|-
| Curb Your Enthusiasm: Season 3| Marla Garlin, Richard Hicks and Ronnie Yeskel – casting directors
| HBO
|-
| Friends: Season 9| Leslie Litt and Barbara Miller – casting directors
| rowspan=3|NBC
|-
| Scrubs: Season 2| Brett Benner and Debby Romano – casting directors
|-
| Will & Grace: Season 5| Tracy Lilienfield – casting director
|-
| rowspan=6 style="text-align:center" | 2004(56th)
|- style="background:#FAEB86"
| Arrested Development: Season 1| Deborah Barylski and Geraldine Leder – casting directors
| Fox
|-
| Curb Your Enthusiasm: Season 4| Allison Jones – casting director
| HBO
|-
| Frasier: Season 10| Jeff Greenberg – casting director
| NBC
|-
| Monk: Season 2| Anya Colloff, Lonnie Hamerman, Meg Liberman, Sandi Logan, Amy McIntyre Britt, and Cami Patton – casting directors
| USA
|-
| Sex and the City: Season 6| Jennifer McNamara – casting director
| HBO
|-
| rowspan=6 style="text-align:center" | 2005(57th)
|- style="background:#FAEB86"
| Desperate Housewives: Season 1| Scott Genkinger and Junie Lowry-Johnson – casting directors
| ABC
|-
| Arrested Development: Season 2| Allison Jones – casting director
| Fox
|-
| Entourage: Season 1| Sheila Jaffe, Meredith Tucker, and Georgianne Walken – casting directors
| HBO
|-
| Scrubs: Season 4| Brett Benner and Debby Romano – casting directors
| rowspan=2|NBC
|-
| Will & Grace: Season 7| Tracy Lilienfield – casting director
|-
| rowspan=7 style="text-align:center" | 2006(58th)
|- style="background:#FAEB86"
| My Name Is Earl: Season 1| Dava Waite Peaslee – casting director
| NBC
|-
| The Comeback: Season 1| Elizabeth Barnes, Meg Liberman, and Cami Patton – casting directors
| rowspan=2|HBO
|-
| Curb Your Enthusiasm: Season 5| Allison Jones – casting director
|-
| Desperate Housewives: Season 2| Scott Genkinger and Junie Lowry-Johnson – casting directors
| ABC
|-
| Entourage: Seasons 3-4| Sheila Jaffe, Meredith Tucker, and Georgianne Walken – casting directors
| HBO
|-
| Weeds: Season 1| Amy McIntyre Britt and Anya Colloff – casting directors
| Showtime
|-
| rowspan=6 style="text-align:center" | 2007(59th)
|- style="background:#FAEB86"
| Ugly Betty: Season 1| Libby Goldstein and Junie Lowry-Johnson – casting directors
| ABC
|-
| Desperate Housewives: Season 3| Junie Lowry-Johnson and Scott Genkinger – casting directors
| ABC
|-
| Entourage: Season 4'| Sheila Jaffe and Georgianne Walken – casting directors
| HBO
|-
| 30 Rock: Season 1| Jennifer McNamara – casting director
| NBC
|-
| Weeds: Season 2| Amy McIntyre Britt and Anya Colloff – casting directors
| Showtime
|-
| rowspan=6 style="text-align:center" | 2008(60th)
|- style="background:#FAEB86"
| 30 Rock: Season 2| Jennifer McNamara Shroff – casting director
| NBC
|-
| Californication: Season 1| Felicia Fasano – casting directors; Pat McCorkle – original New York casting director
| Showtime
|-
| Curb Your Enthusiasm: Season 6| Allison Jones – casting director
| HBO
|-
| Pushing Daisies: Season 1| Camille Patton, Meg Liberman, and Jennifer Lare – casting directors
| rowspan=2|ABC
|-
| Ugly Betty: Season 2| Jeff Greenberg and Mark Scott – casting directors
|-
| rowspan=6 style="text-align:center" | 2009(61st)
|- style="background:#FAEB86"
| 30 Rock: Season 3| Jennifer McNamara-Shroff – casting director
| NBC
|-
| Californication: Season 2| Felicia Fasano – casting director
| Showtime
|-
| The Office: Season 5| Allison Jones – casting director
| NBC
|-
| United States of Tara: Season 1| Allison Jones – original casting director; Cami Patton and Elizabeth Barnes – casting directors
| rowspan=2|Showtime
|-
| Weeds: Season 4| Dava Waite Peaslee – casting director
|}

2010s

2020s

Multiple wins

5 wins
 Jennifer McNamara (2 consecutive, twice)

3 wins
 Allison Jones (2 consecutive)

2 wins
 Jennifer Euston
 Junie Lowry-Johnson
 Meredith Tucker

Programs with multiple wins

3 wins
 30 Rock (2 consecutive)
 Veep (consecutive)

2 wins
 Sex and the City (consecutive)

Programs with multiple nominations

7 nominations
 Modern Family Veep6 nominations
 30 Rock Curb Your Enthusiasm5 nominations
 Nurse Jackie Sex and the City Will & Grace3 nominations
 Barry Desperate Housewives Entourage Frasier The Marvelous Mrs. Maisel Scrubs Silicon Valley Transparent Weeds2 nominations
 Arrested Development Atlanta The Big C Californication Friends Girls Glee Hacks Louie Ted Lasso Ugly Betty Unbreakable Kimmy Schmidt United States of Tara''

Total awards by network
 HBO - 6
 NBC - 5
 ABC - 4
 Fox – 3
 Amazon - 2
 Apple TV+ / Netflix / Pop TV - 1

References

Casting for a Comedy Series
Casting awards